Princess Alexandrine of Prussia may refer to:

 Princess Alexandrine of Prussia (1803–1892), daughter of Frederick William III of Prussia
 Princess Alexandrine of Prussia (1842–1906), daughter of Prince Albert of Prussia
 Princess Alexandrine of Prussia (1915–1980), daughter of Wilhelm, German Crown Prince